Absolute Linux is a lightweight Linux distribution that works on older hardware and is based on Slackware Linux. The client is designed for everyday use (internet, multimedia, documents). Absolute Linux's default window and file managers are IceWM and ROX-Filer. Some of the programs offered by default include: GIMP, LibreOffice, Firefox, Xfburn, p7zip, qBittorrent, and Vivaldi. Many script utilities are included with Absolute Linux to aid with configuration and maintenance of the system.

Absolute Linux uses a graphical frontend to XPKGTOOL. Absolute Linux also bundles Gsplat, a Graphical frontend to Slapt-get which works similarly to Apt-get.

See also
IceWM
Lightweight Portable Security
Lightweight Linux distribution
Slackware
Slapt-get
Linux distribution

References

External links

Operating system distributions bootable from read-only media
Live USB
Light-weight Linux distributions
Linux distributions without systemd
Linux distributions